This is a list of schools in Germany sorted by Bundesland. See also List of universities in Germany.

Baden-Württemberg 

Achern
Gymnasium Achern
Baden-Baden
Gymnasium Hohenbaden
Bad Mergentheim
 Deutschorden-Gymnasium
 Wirtschafts-Gymnasium
 Ernährungswissenschaftliches Gymnasium
 Technisches-Gymnasium
 Informationstechnisches-Gymnasium
 Kopernikus-Realschule
 Grund/Realschule-St.Bernhardt
 Internationales Wirtschaftsgymnasium
 Haus und Landwirtschaftliche Schule
 Lorenz Fries Sonderschule
 Eduard Mörike Hauptschule
 Grund/Hauptschule Ottmar Schönhut Wachbach
 Grundschule Stadtmitte
 Grundschule am Kirchberg
 Grundschule Stuppach/Neunkirchen
 Grundschule Edelfingen
 Grundschule Markelsheim
 Abendrealschule
 Kolping Berufskolleg
 Fachschule für Physiotherapie
 Bischöfliches Internat "Maria hilf"
Bad Säckingen
 Joseph Victor von Scheffel-Gymnasium
Bammental
 Gymnasium Bammental
Bernkastel Kues
 Nikolaus-von-Kues-Gymnasium
Bretten
 Melanchthon-Gymnasium
 Edith-Stein-Gymnasium
Biberach
Pestalozzi-Gymnasium
Blaubeuren
Evangelische Seminare Maulbronn und Blaubeuren
Bruchsal
St. Paulusheim
 Justus-Knecht-Gymnasium
 Käthe-Kollwitz Schule
 Schönborn-Gymnasium
 Karl-Berberich-Schule
Donaueschingen
 KHS Donaueschingen
Ehingen
 Gymnasium Ehingen
Emmendingen
 Goethe-Gymnasium Emmendingen
 Kaufmännische Schulen Emmendingen
 Technisches Gymnasium Emmendingen
Freiburg
 Deutsch-Französische Gymnasien
 Berthold-Gymnasium
 Friedrich-Gymnasium
Heidelberg
 Internationale Gesamtschule Heidelberg
 Heidelberg College (Baden-Württemberg)
Heilbronn
 Robert-Mayer-Gymnasium
 Mönchsee Gymnasium
 Theodor-Heuss-Gymnasium
 Gerhard-Hauptmann-Schule
 Helene-Lange Realschule
 Justinus-Kerner-Gymnasium
Karlsruhe
 Goethe-Gymnasium 
 European School Karlsruhe 
Konstanz
Alexander-von-Humboldt-Gymnasium
Künzelsau
 Freie Schule Anne-Sophie
 Ganerben Gymnasium
Kornwestheim
Theodor-Heuss Realschule
Lahr
 Scheffel-Gymnasium Lahr
Lauffen
 Hölderlin-Gymnasium Lauffen am Neckar
Leonberg
 Johannes-Kepler-Gymnasium Leonberg
Ludwigsburg
Otto-Hahn-Gymnasium
Friedrich-Schiller-Gymnasium
Goethe-Gymnasium
Moerike-Gymnasium
Gottlieb-Daimler Realschule
Elly-Heuss-Knapp Realschule
Mannheim
 Karl-Friedrich-Gymnasium
Moll-Gymnasium
Kurpfalz-Gymnasium (private)
Peter-Petersen-Gymnasium
Elisabeth-Gymnasium
Geschwister-Scholl-Gymnasium
Integrierte Gesamtschule (IGMH)
Lessing-Gymnasium Mannheim
Liselotte-Gymnasium
Feudenheimschule (Gymnasium & Realschule)
Ludwig-Frank-Gymnasium
Mariaberg
Gotthilf-Vöhringer-Schule
Meersburg
Droste-Hülshoff-Gymnasium
Sommertalschule
Nürtingen
Ersberg-Schule
Geschwister-Scholl-Realschule
Hölderlin-Gymnasium
Max-Planck-Gymnasium
Mörike-Schule
Neckar-Realschule
Philipp-Matthäus-Hahn-Schule Nürtingen
Pforzheim
Kepler-Gymnasium
Hebel-Gymnasium
Hilda-Gymnasium
Reuchlin-Gymnasium
Theodor-Heuss-Gymnasium
Schiller-Gymnasium
Fritz-Erler-Schule
Heinrich-Wieland-Schule
Johanna-Wittum-Schule
Ludwig-Erhard-Schule
Goetheschule
Rottweil
Leibniz-Gymnasium Rottweil
Salm
 Schule Schloss Salem (Middle School Campus: Schloss Salem)
Sasbach
 Heimschule Lender
Schopfheim
 Theodor-Heuss-Gymnasium Schopfheim
Schramberg
 Gymnasium Schramberg
Schwäbisch Gmünd
Parler-Gymnasium
Hans-Baldung-Gymnasium
Scheffold-Gymnasium
St. Blasien
 Kolleg St. Blasien
 Stuttgart
 Eberhard-Ludwigs-Gymnasium
Gewerbliche Schule Im Hoppenlau
Johannes- Kepler Gymnasium
Tauberbischofsheim
 Christian-Morgenstern-Grundschule
 Grundschule am Schloss
 Christophorus-Förderschule
 Pestalozzi-Werkrealschule
 Matthias-Grünewald-Gymnasium
 Kaufmännische Schule Tauberbischofsheim, Wirtschaftsgymnasium
 Volkshochschule Mittleres Taubertal
 Euro-Akademie Tauberbischofsheim
Tettnang
Elektronikschule Tettnang
 Montfort-Gymnasium Tettnang
Ulm
 Anna-Essinger-Gymnasium
 Anna-Essinger-Gymnasium
Überlingen
Constantin-Vanotti-Schule, Wirtschaftsgymnasium
Gymnasium Überlingen
Jörg-Zürn-Gewerbeschule, Technisches Gymnasium
Justus-von-Liebig-Schule, Ernährungswissenschaftliches Gymnasium
Realschule Überlingen
 Schule Schloss Salem (Upper School Campuses: Schloss Spetzgart and Härlen)
 Waldorfschule Überlingen
Zell im Wiesental
 Montfort Realschule Zell

Bavaria 
 Alzenau
 Spessart-Gymnasium Alzenau
 Amberg
 Gregor-Mendel-Gymnasium
 Amorbach
 Karl-Ernst-Gymnasium Amorbach
 Andechs
 Carl-Orff-Grundschule (external link)
 Ansbach
 Platen-Gymnasium
 Bad Tölz
 Gabriel-von-Seidel-Gymnasium
 Bad Windsheim
 Georg-Wilhelm-Steller-Gymnasium (external link)
 Berchtesgaden
 Gymnasium Berchtesgaden (external link)
 Coburg
 Casimirianum
 Dachau
 Josef-Effner-Gymnasium (external Link)
 Ignaz-Taschner-Gymnasium (external Link)
 Realschule Dachau (external Link)
Dinkelsbühl
 Wirtschaftsschule Dinkelsbühl (external link)
 Eckental
 Gymnasium Eckental (external link)
 Elsenfeld
 Julius Echter Gymnasium (external link)
 Erding
 Anne-Frank-Gymnasium Erding (external link)
 Gymnasium Erding 2 (external link)
 Erlenbach
 Hermann Staudinger Gymnasium (external link)
 Eichstätt
 Willibald-Gymnasium (external link)
 Freising
 Dom-Gymnasium (external link)
 Fürstenfeldbruck
 Graf-Rasso-Gymnasium (external link)
 Viscardi-Gymnasium (external link)
 Fürth
 Helene-Lange-Gymnasium
 Heinrich-Schliemann-Gymnasium
 Hardenberg-Gymnasium
 Cars
 Gymnasium Gars
 Geretsried
 Gymnasium Geretsried (external link)
 Germering
 Max-Born-Gymnasium (external link)
 Carl-Spitzweg-Gymnasium (external link)
 Günzburg
 Dossenberger Gymnasium (external link)
 Maria-Ward-Gymnasium Günzburg (external link)
 Dominikus-Zimmermann-Realschule (external link)
 Maria-Ward-Realschule Günzburg (external link)
 Maria-Theresia-Hauptschule (external link)
 Berufsschule Günzburg (external link)
 Gröbenzell
 Gymnasium Gröbenzell (external link)
 Herrsching
 Realschule Herrsching (external link)
 Grund- and Hauptschule Herrsching
 Ingolstadt
 Apian-Gymnasium
 Ludwig-Fronhofer Realschule
 Katharinen-Gymnasium Ingolstadt (external link)
 Kempten
 Carl-von-Linde Gymnasium (external link)
 Allgäu-Gymnasium (external link)
 Hildegardis-Gymnasium (external link) 
 Städtische Realschule (external link) 
 Realschule an der Salzstraße (Staatliche Realschule) (external link) 
 Maria-Ward-Schule Kempten (external link) 
 Landheim
Landheim Schondorf (external link, English and German)
 Landshut
 Hans-Leinberger-Gymnasium (external link)
 Hans-Carossa-Gymnasium (external link)
 Lindau
Bodensee-Gymnasium (external link)
Valentin-Heider-Gymnasium (external link)
Knabenrealschule Lindau (external link)
Maria-Ward-Realschule (external link)
 Lindenberg
Gymnasium Lindenberg (external link, German)
 Marktoberdorf
Gymnasium Marktoberdorf (external link, German)
 Markt Schwaben
 Grundschule Markt Schwaben
 Volksschule Markt Schwaben
 Lena-Christ-Realschule
 Franz-Marc-Gymnasium
 Memmingen
 Bernhard-Strigel-Gymnasium (external link)
 Vöhlin-Gymnasium (external link)
 Staatliche Realschule Memmingen (external link)
 Sebastian-Lotzer Realschule Memmingen (external link)
 Miltenberg
 Johannes-Butzbach-Gymnasium Miltenberg
 Mindelheim
Maristenkolleg Mindelheim (external link)
Maria-Ward-Realschule Mindelheim (external link)
 Munich
European University, Munich
European School, Munich
Gisela Gymnasium
Grundschule an der Herrnstraße
Klenze-Gymnasium (external link)
Luitpold-Gymnasium
Maria-Theresia-Gymnasium
 Neubeuern
Schloss Neubeuern (external link, English, German, Russian)
 Neumarkt in der Oberpfalz
 Willibald-Gluck-Gymnasium (external link)
 Neu-Ulm
 Lessing-Gymnasium Neu-Ulm (external link)
 Bertha-von-Suttner-Gymnasium Neu-Ulm (external link)
 Nuremberg
 Melanchthon-Gymnasium (external link)
 Peter-Vischer-Gymnasium (external link)
 Oberallgäu
 Grund- und Mittelschule Waltenhofen (external link)
 Grund- und Mittelschule Buchenberg (external link)
 Grundschule Sulzberg (external link)
Oettingen
 Albrecht-Ernst Gymnasium (external link)
 Olching
 Gymnasium Olching (external link)
 Regensburg
 Albertus-Magnus-Gymnasium (external link)
 Albrecht-Altdorfer-Gymnasium
 Goethe-Gymnasium (external link)
 Regensburg International School  (external link)
 Reichersbeuern
Max-Rill-Schule Schloss Reicherbeuern (external link, German)
 Schwangau
Gymnasium Hohenschwangau (external link, German)
 Schweinfurt
 Alexander-von-Humboldt-Gymnasium
 Walther-Rathenau-Realschule und Gymnasium, Schweinfurt
 Olympia-Morata-Gymnasium, Schweinfurt
 Starnberg
 Gymnasium Starnberg (external link)
 Stein an der Traun
Schule Schloss Stein (external link, Chinese, English, German, Romanian, Spanish)
 Tutzing
 Gymnasium Tutzing (external link)
 Benedictus-Realschule (external link)
 Grund- and Hauptschule Tutzing
 Veitshöchheim
 Gymnasium Veitshöchheim
 Vöhringen
 Illertal-Gymnasium Vöhringen (external link)
 Weiden (i.d.Opf.)
 Augustinus-Gymnasium (external link)
 Windsbach
 Johann-Sebastian-Bach-Gymnasium (external link)
 Wolfratshausen
 Volksschule Waldram (external link)
 Staatliche Realschule Wolfratshausen (external link)
 Würzburg
 Deutschhaus-Gymnasium
 Friedrich-Koenig-Gymnasium
 Matthias-Grünewald-Gymnasium
 Mozart-Schönborn-Gymnasium
 Riemenschneider-Gymnasium
 Röntgen-Gymnasium
 St. Ursula-Schule
 Wirsberg-Gymnasium
 Würzburg American High School

Berlin 
Berlin British School
Berlin Cosmopolitan School
Berlin International School
Berlin Metropolitan School
Canisius-Kolleg Berlin
Emanuel-Lasker-Oberschule
Ernst-Abbe-Gymnasium
Evangelisches Gymnasium zum Grauen Kloster
Französisches Gymnasium Berlin
Evangelische Schule Frohnau
Gottfried-Keller-Gymnasium
Oberschule am Elsengrund
Rütli School
Sophie-Charlotte-Gymnasium
Werner-von-Siemens-Gymnasium
Schiller Gymnasium
Hannah-Arendt-Gymnasium
Hermann-von-Helmholtz-Schule
Wilma-Rudolph-Oberschule

Brandenburg 
 Beeskow
 Rouanet-Gymnasium Beeskow (external link)
 Cottbus
 
 Dallgow-Döberitz
 Marie-Curie-Gymnasium (external link)
 Falkensee
 Lise-Meitner-Gymnasium
 Lenzen
 Gijsels van Lier Grundschule (external link)
 Luckau
 Bohnstedt-Gymnasium
 Wittenberge
 Marie-Curie-Gymnasium Wittenberge
 Wittstock
 Gymnasium Wittstock (external link)
 Dr.-Wilhelm-Polthier Oberschule (external link)

Bremen 
 Abendschule Bremerhaven
 Albert-Einstein-Oberschule
 Alexander-von-Humboldt-Gymnasium
 Alfred-Delp-Schule
 Allgemeine Berufsschule
 Allmersschule
 
 Altwulsdorfer Schule
 Amerikanische Schule
 Anne-Frank-Schule
 Astrid-Lindgren-Schule
 Beluga College gGmbH
 Bremer Heimstiftung
 Bürgermeister-Smidt-Schule
 Edith-Stein-Schule
 Eduard-Nebelthau-Gymnasium
 
 EUMAC-European Musical Academy
 Fichteschule
 Förderzentrum für den Bereich sozial-emotionale Entwicklung
 Förderzentrum Huchting
 Förderzentrum Obervieland
 
 Freie Evangelische Bekenntnisschule Bremen - Grundschule 
 Freie Waldorfschule
 Freie Waldorfschule Bremen-Nord
 Freie Waldorfschule Bremen-Osterholz
 Friedehorst - Vereinigte Anstalten der Inneren Mission
 Friedrich-Ebert-Schule
 Fritz-Husmann-Schule
 Fritz-Reuter-Schule
 Gaußschule I
 Gaußschule II
 Gaußschule III
 Georg-Büchner-Schule I
 Georg-Büchner-Schule II
 Gerhard-Rohlfs-Oberschule
 Gesamtschule Bremen-Mitte an der Hemelinger Straße
 
 Gesamtschule Bremen-West an der Lissaer Straße
 Goetheschule
 Gorch-Fock-Schule
 
 Gymnasium Horn
 Gymnasium Obervieland
 Gymnasium Vegesack
 Heinrich-Heine-Schule
 Hermann-Böse-Gymnasium
 Humboldtschule
 Immanuel-Kant-Schule
 Integratives Bildungszentrum (IBZ)
 Integrierte Stadtteilschule Obervieland
 Integrierter Stadtteilschule Lehe
 International School of Bremen
 Johannesschule
 Johann-Gutenberg-Schule
 Johann-Heinrich-Pestalozzi-Schule - Integrierte Stadtteilschule -
 Joli Visage
 Karl-Marx-Schule
 Kinderschule
 
 Lessingschule
 Lloyd Gymnasium Bremerhaven Haus Wiener Straße
 Lutherschule
 Marie-Curie-Schule
 Marktschule
 Neue Oberschule Gröpelingen
 Neues Gymnasium in Obervieland
 
 Oberschule am Waller Ring
 Oberschule an der Carl-Goerdeler-Straße
 Oberschule an der Helgolander Straße
 Oberschule an der Helsinkistraße
 Oberschule an der Hermannsburg
 Oberschule an der Koblenzer Straße
 Oberschule an der Lerchenstraße
 Oberschule an der Ronzelenstraße
 Oberschule an der Schaumburger Straße
 Oberschule Findorff
 Oberschule Habenhausen
 Oberschule In den Sandwehen
 Oberschule Lesum
 Oberschule Roter Sand
 Ökumenisches Gymnasium zu Bremen
 "Parität. Bildungswerk Bremen / Institut für soziale und interkulturelle Weiterbildung"
 Paula-Modersohn-Schule
 Pestalozzischule
 Pflegekompetenzzentrum
 Privatschule Mentor gGmbH
  (closed 1970)
 Roland zu Bremen Oberschule
 St.-Ansgar-Schule
 St.-Antonius-Schule
 
 St.-Joseph-Schule
 St.-Marien-Schule
 St.-Pius-Schule
 Schule Alt-Aumund
 Schule am Alten Postweg
 Schule am Baumschulenweg
 Schule Am Borgfelder Saatland
 Schule am Bunnsackerweg
 Schule am Buntentorsteinweg
 Schule am Ellenerbrokweg
 Schule am Halmerweg
 Schule Am Leher Markt
 Schule Am Mönchshof
 Schule Am Oslebshauser Park
 Schule am Osterhop
 Schule am Pastorenweg
 Schule am Pfälzer Weg
 Schule am Pulverberg
 Schule am Pürschweg
 Schule am Rhododendronpark
 Schule Am Wasser
 Schule Am Weidedamm
 Schule an der Admiralstraße
 Schule an der Alfred-Faust-Straße
 Schule an der Andernacher Straße
 Schule an der Augsburger Straße
 Schule an der Bardowickstraße
 Schule an der Brinkmannstraße
 Schule an der Carl-Schurz-Straße
 Schule an der Delfter Straße
 Schule an der Dudweilerstraße
 Schule an der Düsseldorfer Straße
 Schule an der Fischerhuder Straße
 Schule an der Freiligrathstraße
 Schule an der Fritz-Gansberg-Straße
 Schule An der Gete
 Schule an der Glockenstraße
 Schule an der Grambker Heerstraße
 Schule an der Horner Heerstraße
 Schule an der Kantstraße
 Schule an der Karl-Lerbs-Straße
 Schule an der Kerschensteinerstr.
 Schule an der Landskronastraße
 Schule an der Lessingstraße
 Schule an der Louis-Seegelken-Str.
 Schule an der Mainstraße
 Schule an der Marcusallee
 Schule an der Melanchthonstraße
 Schule an der Nordstraße
 Schule an der Oderstraße
 Schule an der Oslebshauser Heerstr.
 Schule an der Parsevalstraße
 Schule an der Paul-Singer-Straße
 Schule an der Philipp-Reis-Straße
 Schule an der Rechtenflether Str.
 Schule an der Reepschlägerstraße
 Schule an der Robinsbalje
 Schule an der Schmidtstraße
 
 Schule an der Stichnathstraße
 Schule an der Uphuser Straße
 Schule an der Vegesacker Straße
 Schule an der Wigmodistraße
 Schule an der Witzlebenstraße
 Schule an der Züricher Straße
 Schule Arbergen
 Schule Arsten
 Schule Auf den Heuen
 Schule Borchshöhe
 Schule Borgfeld
 Schule Burgdamm
 Schule Fährer Flur
 Schule Farge-Rekum
 Schule Grolland
 Schule Hammersbeck
 Schule In der Vahr
 Schule Kirchhuchting
 Schule Mahndorf
 Schule Oberneuland
 Schule Osterholz
 Schule Rablinghausen
 Schule Rönnebeck
 Schule St. Magnus
 Schule Schönebeck
 Schule Seehausen
 Schule Strom
 Schulzentrum an der Julius-Brecht-Allee
 Schulzentrum an der Lemhorster Straße
 Schulzentrum Bürgermeister Smidt
 Schulzentrum Carl von Ossietzky
 Schulzentrum der Sekundarstufe II Wilhelm-Wagenfeld-Schule
 Schulzentrum des Sekundarbereichs II am Rübekamp
 Schulzentrum des Sekundarbereichs II an der Alwin-Lonke-Straße
 Schulzentrum des Sekundarbereichs II an der Bördestraße
 Schulzentrum des Sekundarbereichs II an der Grenzstraße
 Schulzentrum des Sekundarbereichs II an der Kurt-Schumacher-Allee
 Schulzentrum des Sekundarbereichs II an der Walliser Straße
 Schulzentrum des Sekundarbereichs II Blumenthal
 Schulzentrum des Sekundarbereichs II Horn
 Schulzentrum des Sekundarbereichs II Neustadt
 Schulzentrum des Sekundarbereichs II Techn. Bildungszentrum Mitte
 Schulzentrum des Sekundarbereichs II Utbremen
 Schulzentrum des Sekundarbereichs II Vegesack
 Schulzentrum des Sekundarbereichs II Walle
 Schulzentrum Geschwister Scholl
 Schulzentrum Rockwinkel
 Schulzentrum Sebaldsbrück
 Surheider Schule
 Tami-Oelfken-Schule
 Technikerschule Bremen
 Tobias-Schule
 Veernschule
 Verwaltungsschule der Freien Hansestadt Bremen
 Werkstattschule Bremerhaven
 Wilhelm-Focke-Oberschule
 Wilhelm-Kaisen-Oberschule
 Wilhelm-Olbers-Schule

Hamburg 
Primary schools
Grundschule Müssenredder
Grundschule Anna-Susanna-Stieg
Grundschule Rönnkamp
Grundschule Schulkamp
Grundschule der Gesamtschule Blankenese, Grotefendweg
Secondary schools
State schools
Albert-Schweitzer-Gymnasium
Albrecht-Thaer-Gymnasium
Alexander-von-Humboldt-Gymnasium
Carl-von-Ossietzky-Gymnasium
Charlotte-Paulsen-Gymnasium
Christianeum
Emilie-Wüstenfeld-Gymnasium
Erich Kästner-Gesamtschule
Friedrich-Ebert-Gymnasium
Fritz-Schumacher-Schule
Gelehrtenschule des Johanneums
Gesamtschule Lohbrügge
Gesamtschule Winterhude
Geschwister Scholl-Stadtteilschule
Goethe-Gymnasium
Gymnasium Allee 
Gymnasium Allermöhe
Gymnasium Alstertal
Gymnasium Altona
Gymnasium Blankenese
Gymnasium Bondenwald
Gymnasium Bornbrook
Gymnasium Buckhorn
Gymnasium Corveystraße
Gymnasium der Heinrich-Hertz-Schule
Gymnasium der Kooperativen Schule Tonndorf
Gymnasium Dörpsweg
Gymnasium Eppendorf 
Gymnasium Farmsen 
Gymnasium Finkenwerder
Gymnasium Grootmoor
Gymnasium Hamm
Gymnasium Heidberg
Gymnasium Hochrad
Gymnasium Hummelsbüttel
Gymnasium Kirchdorf-Wilhelmsburg
Gymnasium Klosterschule
Gymnasium Lerchenfeld
Gymnasium Lohbrügge
Gymnasium Marienthal
Gymnasium Meiendorf
Gymnasium Oberalster
Gymnasium Ohlstedt
Gymnasium Ohmoor
Gymnasium Oldenfelde
Gymnasium Osterbek
Gymnasium Othmarschen
Gymnasium Rahlstedt
Gymnasium Rissen
Gymnasium Süderelbe
Gymnasium-Kaiser-Friedrich-Ufer
Hansa-Gymnasium Bergedorf
Heilwig Gymnasium
Heinrich-Heine-Gymnasium
Heinrich-Hertz-Schule
Heisenberg-Gymnasium
Helene-Lange-Gymnasium
Immanuel-Kant-Gymnasium
Irena-Sendler-Schule formerly Peter-Petersen-Schule 
Johannes-Brahms-Gymnasium
Julius-Leber-Schule
Kooperative Schule Tonndorf
Kurt-Körber-Gymnasium
Lise-Meitner-Gymnasium 
Luisen-Gymnasium Bergedorf
Margaretha-Rothe-Gymnasium
Marion-Dönhoff-Gymnasium formerly Gymnasium Willhöden
Matthias-Claudius-Gymnasium
Max-Brauer-Schule
Otto-Hahn-Schule
Schule am Hafen
Schule am See
Stadtteilschule Allermöhe
Stadtteilschule Alter Teichweg
Stadtteilschule Altona
Stadtteilschule Altrahlstedt
Stadtteilschule Am Heidberg
Stadtteilschule Bahrenfeld
Stadtteilschule Barmbek: Emil-Krause Gymnasium/Schule Fraenkelstraße/Schule Tieloh 
Stadtteilschule Benzenbergweg
Stadtteilschule Bergedorf
Stadtteilschule Bergstedt
Stadtteilschule Blankenese formerly Gesamtschule Blankenese
Stadtteilschule Bramfelder Dorfplatz / Hegholt
Stadtteilschule Ehestorfer-Weg
Stadtteilschule Eidelstedt
Stadtteilschule Eppendorf formerly Gesamtschule Eppendorf
Stadtteilschule Finkenwerder
Stadtteilschule Fischbek
Stadtteilschule Goosacker
Stadtteilschule Griesstraße / Lohmühlen
Stadtteilschule Hanhoopsfeld / Sinstorf
Stadtteilschule Horn
Stadtteilschule Ida-Ehre-Gesamtschule
Stadtteilschule in Lurup (Schule Am Altonaer Volkspark / Schule Luruper Hauptstraße) 
Stadtteilschule Kirchdorf
Stadtteilschule Kirchwerder
Stadtteilschule Langenhorn
Stadtteilschule Mümmelmannsberg
Stadtteilschule Niendorf formerly Gesamtschule Niendorf
Stadtteilschule Öjendorf
Stadtteilschule Oldenfelde
Stadtteilschule Poppenbüttel
Stadtteilschule Richard-Linde-Weg
Stadtteilschule Stellingen
Stadtteilschule Stübenhofer Weg
Stadtteilschule Süderelbe
Stadtteilschule Walddörfer
Stadtteilschule Wilhelmsburg
Stadtteiltschule Harburg formerly Gesamtschule Harburg
Walddörfer Gymnasium
Wilhelm-Gymnasium 
Private schools
Brecht-Schule Hamburg, a private school
Bugenhagenschule, Blankenese, a private school
Sankt-Ansgar-Schule, a Catholic Gymnasium
Other
Schule Bullenhuser Damm
International School of Hamburg
Neue Schule Hamburg, a private school

Hessen 
Bad Homburg vor der Höhe
Kaiserin-Friedrich-Gymnasium
Humboldtschule
Gesamtschule am Gluckenstein
Maria-Ward-Schule
Feldbergschule (branch Bad Homburg)
Bad Wildungen
Ense-Schule
Gustav-Stresemann-Gymnasium
Darmstadt
Schulzentrum Marienhöhe
Edertal
Gesamtschule Edertal
Frankfurt am Main
Anna-Schmidt-Schule
Bettinaschule
Carl-Schurz-Schule
Frankfurt American High School
Friedrich-Dessauer-Gymnasium
Goethe-Gymnasium
Heinrich-von-Gagern-Gymnasium
Helene-Lange-Schule (Frankfurt am Main)
Lessing-Gymnasium
Friedrichsdorf
Philipp-Reis-Schule
Rhein-Main International Montessori School
Gießen
 Aliceschule
 Gesamtschule-Gießen-Ost
 Landgraf-Ludwig-Gymnasium
 Liebigschule
 Ricarda Huch-Schule
 Theodor Litt-Schule
Hanau
Hohe Landesschule
Höchst i. Odw.
Ernst-Göbel-Schule
Hofheim am Taunus
MTK Gymnasium
Langen
Dreieichschule, Gymnasium des Kreises Offenbach
Kassel
Friedrichsgymnasium (FG)
Freie Waldorfschule
Herderschule
Heinrich-Schütz-Schule (HSS)
Georg-Christoph-Lichtenberg-Gymnasium (LG)
Marburg
Elisabethschule Marburg
Carl-Strehl-Schule
Oberursel
Frankfurt International School
Offenbach
Rudolf-Koch-Schule
Georg-Kerschensteiner-Schule, Obertshausen
Pohlheim
 Adolf-Reichwein-Schule
Rüsselsheim
Gustav-Heinemann-Schule
Immanuel-Kant-Schule
Max-Planck-Schule
Neues Gymnasium
Werner-Heisenberg-Schule
Usingen
Christian-Wirth-Schule
Wiesbaden
Elly-Heuss-Schule, Wiesbaden
Carl-von-Ossietzky-Schule, Wiesbaden
Diesterwegschule, Wiesbaden
Goetheschule, Wiesbaden
Gutenbergschule, Wiesbaden
Gymnasium am Mosbacher Berg
Helene-Lange-School (Wiesbaden)
Elementary school Riederbergschule, Wiesbaden

Lower Saxony 
Bad Harzburg
Werner-von-Siemens-Gymnasium
Braunschweig
 Gymnasium Gaussschule
 
 
 
 
 
 
 Gymnasium Ricarda-Huch-Schule (Braunschweig)
 Gymnasium Neue Oberschule
 Lessinggymnasium
Bremervörde
 Findorff-Realschule
 Grundschule Engeo
 Grundschule Stadtmitte
 Gymnasium Bremervörde
 Hauptschule Bremervörde
 Johann-Heinrich-von-Thünen-Schule
 Schule am Mahlersberg
Buxtehude
 Elementary School ""
 Elementary School "Harburger Straße" 
 Elementary School "Hedendorf"
 Elementary School "Neukloster"
 Elementary School "Rotkäppchenweg"
 Elementary School "Stieglitzweg" with the branch location of "Ottensen"
 Schulzentrum Süd including: Gymnasium Süd  official website, a Hauptschule and a Realschule
 Halepaghen-Schule
 Schulzentrum Nord including: a Hauptschule and a Realschule
 Berufsbildende Schulen (BBS) 
Celle
 
 Hölty Gymnasium Celle
 
 Kaiserin-Auguste-Viktoria Gymnasium
Cloppenburg
 Liebfrauenschule
 Technikgymnasium
Edewechterdamm
 Grundschule Edewechterdamm
Friesoythe
 Albertus-Magnus-Gymnasium 
 Wirtschaftsgymnasium
 Berufsbildende Schulen (BBS)
Gehrden (Region Hannover)
 
Göttingen
 Felix-Klein-Gymnasium (FKG)
 Georg-Christoph-Lichtenberg-Gesamtschule (IGS)
 Geschwister-Scholl-Gesamtschule (KGS)
 Hainberg-Gymnasium (HG)
 Heinrich-Heine-Schule, Hauptschule
 Käthe-Kollwitz-Schule, Hauptschule
 Max-Planck-Gymnasium
 Otto-Hahn-Gymnasium (OHG)
 Theodor-Heuss-Gymnasium (THG)
 Voigt-Realschule
Hameln
 Wilhelm-Raabe-Schule, Realschule
 , Realschule
 Theodor-Heuss-Realschule, Realschule
 Viktoria-Luise-Gymnasium, Gymnasium
 Schiller-Gymnasium Hameln, Gymnasium
 Albert-Einstein-Gymnasium Hameln, Gymnasium
Handrup
 
Hannover
 Wilhelm-Raabe-Schule, Gymnasium 
 Lutherschule, Gymnasium
 St. Ursula Schule, Gymnasium
 Geschwister Scholl Schule, Realschule
 Hauptschule Büssingweg
 Tellkampfschule, Gymnasium
 IGS List
 IGS Roderbruch
Hann. Münden
 Grotefend-Gymnasium Münden
Kampe
 Verlässliche Grundschule Kampe
Oldenburg
 Cäcilienschule Oldenburg
 Gymnasium Graf-Anton-Guenther School
 Herbart-Gymnasium
 Liebfrauenschule Oldenburg
Verden
 
 Wolfenbüttel
 Gymnasium im Schloss
 Gymnasium Große Schule
 Theodor-Heuss-Gymnasium
Wolfsburg

Mecklenburg-Vorpommern 
Bad Doberan
Friderico-Francisceum
Bergen auf Rügen
Ernst-Moritz-Arndt Gymnasium
Ludwigslust
Goethe-Gymnasium
Rostock
CJD Christophorusschule Rostock
Erasmus-Gymnasium (external link)
Grundschule Lütt-Matten (external link)
Schwerin
Goethe-Gymnasium
Gymnasium Fridericianum
Torgelow am See
Internatgymnasium Schloss Torgelow (external link, English and German)

North Rhine-Westphalia 
Ahlen
Bodelschwinghschule (external link)
Geschwister-Scholl-Schule (external link)
Overbergschule (external link)
Johanna-Rose-Schule (external link)
Fritz-Winter-Gesamtschule (external link)
Städtische Realschule Ahlen (external link)
Städtischen Gymnasium Ahlen (external link)
Gymnasium St. Michael (external link)
Balve
Städt. Gemeinschaftshauptschule Balve
Städt. Realschule Balve
Barntrup
Gymnasium Barntrup (external link)
Bergisch Gladbach
Albertus-Magnus-Gymnasium
Nicolaus-Cusanus-Gymnasium Bergisch Gladbach
Otto-Hahn-Sonderschule
Bielefeld
Laborschule Bielefeld
Bochum
Albert-Einstein-Schule
Graf-Engelbert-Schule
Hildegardis-Schule Bochum website (external link, in German)
Bonn
Aloisiuskolleg - Jesuit boarding school in Bad Godesberg
Amos-Comenius-Gymnasium Bonn (external link)
Collegium Josephinum Bonn (external link)
Helmholtz-Gymnasium, Bonn (external link)
Hardtberg-Gymnasium (external link)
Kardinal-Frings-Gymnasium website (external link) - Catholic mixed school
Liebfrauenschule Bonn - Catholic Girls school
Nicolaus-Cusanus-Gymnasium Bonn
Sankt-Adelheid-Gymnasium - Catholic Girls school (external link)
Bonn International School
Independent Bonn International School
Bottrop
Josef-Albers-Gymnasium, Bottrop (external link)
Brakel
Gymnasium Brede, Brakel (external link)
Dinslaken
Konrad Adenauer Berufskolleg (external link, German)
Dortmund
 Goethe-Gymnasium, Dortmund
Gartenstadt, Dortmund (external link, German)
Dülmen
Internat Schloss Buldern (external link, English and German)
Düsseldorf
International School of Düsseldorf

Theodor-Fliedner-Internat (external link, English and German)
Max-Planck-Gymnasium Düsseldorf 
Essen
Albert-Einstein-Realschule (external link, German)
B.M.V.-Schule Essen (external link, German)
Burggymnasium Essen
Goethe-Gymnasium (external link, German and English)
Grashof-Gymnasium (external link, German)
Gustav-Heinemann-Gesamtschule Essen (external link)
Gymnasium Essen Nord Ost (external link)

Maria-Wächter-Gymnasium (external link, German)
Theodor-Heuss-Gymnasium Essen (external link, German)
Euskirchen
Marienschule Euskirchen (external link)
Gelsenkirchen
Gemeinschaftsgrundschule Im Brömm
Leibniz-Gymnasium Gelsenkirchen (external link)
Hamm
Landschulheim Schloss Heessen (external link, German)
Hilchenbach

Herne
Otto Hahn Gymnasium (external link)
Iserlohn

Krefeld
Marienschule Krefeld
St.-Pius-Gymnasium
Kreuztal
Städtisches Gymnasium Kreuztal (external link, German)
Kerpen
Gymnasium der Stadt Kerpen
Köln
Max-Ernst-Gesamtschule 
Dreikönigsgymnasium
Königin-Luise-Schule (external link)
Humboldt Gymnasium Köln (external link)
Königswinter
CJD Christophorusschule Königswinter
Leverkusen
Werner-Heisenberg Gymnasium (external link)
Menden
Heilig-Geist-Gymnasium

Walramgymnasium
Meschede
 St. Walburga Hauptschule 
Realschule der Stadt Meschede
Gymnasium der Stadt Meschede
Gymnasium der Benediktiner
Mönchengladbach
Bischöfliche Marienschule Mönchengladbach
Mülheim an der Ruhr
Gustav-Heinemann-Gesamtschule (external link, German)
Neuss
Alexander-von-Humboldt-Gymnasium
ISR Internationale Schule am Rhein in Neuss
Paderborn
Goerdeler-Gymnasium Paderborn
Gymnasium St. Michael (external link, German)
Gymnasium Schloss Neuhaus (external link, German)
Gymnasium Theodorianum (external link, German and English)
Pelizaeus-Gymnasium (external link, German)
Reismann-Gymnasium (external link, German)
Unna
Geschwister-Scholl-Gymnasium
Xanten
 Stiftsgymnasium Xanten (SSGX)
 Marienschule Xanten

Rhineland-Palatinate 
Trier
Friedrich-Wilhelm Gymnasium
Max-Planck-Gymnasium
Bad Marienberg:
Realschule am Erlenweg
elementary school Wolfsteinschule
Haßloch
High School
Hannah-Arendt-Gymnasium
Secondary Modern School 
Sophie-Scholl-Realschule
Secondary School
Kurpfalzschule
Primary Schools
Ernst-Reuter-Schule
Friedrich-Schiller-Schule
Special School
Gottlieb-Wenz-Schule
Montessori-Schule-Haßloch
Kaiserslautern
Militarische Schule
Deutsches Auslander Gruppe
High School
Albert-Schweitzer-Gymnasium
Burggymnasium
Gymnasium am Rittersberg
Heinrich-Heine-Gymnasium
Hohenstaufen-Gymnasium
St.-Franziskus-Gymnasium und Realschule
Kusel
High Schools:
Gymnasium Kusel
Realschule Kusel
Lahnstein
High Schools:
Johannes-Gymnasium Lahnstein
Ludwigshafen am Rhein
High Schools:
Carl-Bosch-Gymnasium
Geschwister-Scholl-Gymnasium Ludwigshafen
Max-Planck-Gymnasium
Technisches Gymnasium BBS I
Theodor-Heuss-Gymnasium
Wilhelm-von-Humboldt-Gymnasium
Wirtschaftsgymnasium
Six-form high schools:
Anne-Frank-Realschule
Karolina-Burger-Realschule
Kopernikus-Realschule Ludwigshafen
Realschule Ludwigshafen-Edigheim
Realschule Mutterstadt
Vocational schools:
BBS Hauswirtschaft und Sozialpädagogik
BBS Naturwissenschaften
BBS Wirtschaft I
Berufsbildende Schule Technik I - BBS TI
Berufsbildende Schule Technik II
Berufsbildende Schule Wirtschaft II
Fachoberschule Gestaltung, BBS Technik I
Höhere Berufsfachschule Wirtschaft, BBS Wirtschaft II
Maxschule
Neustadt an der Weinstraße

International School Neustadt
Neuwied
Landesschule für Blinde und Sehbehinderte Neuwied
Landesschule für Gehörlose und Schwerhörige Neuwied
Sinzig
 Rheingymnasium
Westerburg
BBS Westerburg

Saarland 
Graf-Ludwig-Gesamtschule
Neunkirchen
Gymnasium am Krebsberg
Gymnasium am Steinwald
Gesamtschule Neunkirchen
Bexbach
Gesamtschule Bexbach
Peter-Wust-Gymnasium Merzig
Saarbrücken
Willi-Graf-Gymnasium
Marienschule (Gymnasium)
Deutsch-Französisches Gymnasium
Otto-Hahn-Gymnasium
Ludwigsgymnasium
Gymnasium am Schloss
Gymnasium am Rotenbühl
Willi-Graf-Realschule
Gemeinschaftsschule Bruchwiese
Gemeinschaftsschule Ludwigspark

Saxony 
Bautzen
Serbski gymnazij Budyšin/Sorbisches Gymnasium Bautzen (external link)
Chemnitz
Johannes-Kepler-Gymnasium
Dresden
St.-Benno-Gymnasium
Bertolt-Brecht-Gymnasium
Gymnasium Dresden-Bühlau
Gymnasium Bürgerwiese
Christliche Schule Dresden-Zschachwitz
Gymnasium Dresden-Cotta
Marie-Curie-Gymnasium
Gymnasium Dreikönigschule
Hans-Erlwein-Gymnasium
Julius-Ambrosius-Hülße-Gymnasium
Dresden International School
Evangelisches Kreuzgymnasium
Martin-Andersen-Nexø-Gymnasium Dresden
Pestalozzi-Gymnasium
Gymnasium Dresden-Plauen
Romain-Rolland-Gymnasium
Sportgymnasium
Vitzthum-Gymnasium
Sächsisches Landesgymnasium für Musik „Carl-Maria-von-Weber“
Leipzig
Anton-Philipp-Reclam-Schule
Goethe-Gymnasium
Immanuel-Kant-Gymnasium
Kurt-Masur-Schule
Robert-Schumann-Gymnasium
Thomasschule zu Leipzig
Wilhelm-Ostwald-Gymnasium
Löbau
Geschwister-Scholl-Gymnasium Löbau
Meißen
Landesgymnasium St. Afra for gifted students
Nossen
Geschwister Scholl Gymnasium Nossen

Saxony-Anhalt 
 Gymnasium
 Christian-Wolff-Gymnasium (Halle/Saale)
 Carolinum (Bernburg)
 Domgymnasium (Naumburg)
 Elisabeth Gymnasium (Halle/Saale)
 Georg-Cantor-Gymnasium (Halle/Saale)
 Latina August Hermann Franke Gymnasium (Halle/Saale)
 Martin-Luther-Gymnasium (Lutherstadt Eisleben)
 Ökumenisches Domgymnasium (Magdeburg)
 Südstadt-Gymnasium (Halle/Saale)
 Landesschule Pforta (Schulpforte)
 Thomas-Münzer-Gymnasium (Halle/Saale)
 Werner-von-Siemens-Gymnasium (Magdeburg)
 Sekundarschulen
 Sekundarschule Landsberg (Landsberg)
 Neustadtschule (Weißenfels)
 Beuditzschule (Weißenfels
 Ökoweg-Schule (Weißenfels)
 Goetheschule (Merseburg)
 Sekundarschule Elster (Elster)
Grundschulen
 Grundschule Hohenthurm (Hohenthurm)
 Bergschule Landsberg (Landsberg)
 Grundschule Niemberg (Niemberg)
 Evangelische Grundschule (Oppin)
 Grundschule Elster (Elster)
Förderschulen
 Förderschule für geistig Behinderte "Regenbogen" (Landsberg)
Berufsschulen

Schleswig-Holstein 
Bad Schwartau
Leibniz-Gymnasium
Gymnasium am Mühlenberg
Güby
Stiftung Louisenlund (external link, German)
Husum
Hermann Tast Schule
Theodor Storm Schule
Lübeck
Katharineum
Oberschule zum Dom
Norderstedt 
Coppernicus-Gymnasium
Wedel
Johann-Rist-Gymnasium

Thuringia 
Gebesee
Oskar-Gründler-Gymnasium
Gera
Goethe-Gymnasium
Jena
Carl-Zeiss-Gymnasium, Jena
Schleiz
Konrad-Duden-Gymnasium

See also
Education in Germany
 Gymnasium (Germany)
Gymnasium (school)

References

Germany